Everton Zvikomborero Matambanadzo (born April 13, 1976 in Salisbury (now Harare), is a former Zimbabwean cricketer who played in 3 Tests and 7 ODIs from 1996 to 1999. His cricket career was rather brief, due to intense knee injuries.

Personal life 
He has a twin brother, Darlington, who played first-class cricket for Mashonaland. 

He moved to the United States in 2001.

He completed an economics degree at UC Berkeley. Everton is currently a stock trader.

References 

1976 births
Living people
Cricketers from Harare
Alumni of Eaglesvale High School
Zimbabwe Test cricketers
Zimbabwe One Day International cricketers
Zimbabwean cricketers
Mashonaland cricketers
Zimbabwean twins
Twin sportspeople